Stuttard is a surname. Notable people by that name include:

 Ellis Stuttard (1920–1983), English professional association footballer.
 John Stuttard (born 1945), English chartered accountant and Lord Mayor of the City of London in 2006–07.
 David Stuttard, British theatre director, classical scholar, translator, lecturer on classical literature and history, and author.
 Marcus Stuttard, chief executive of the Alternative Investment Market in London.